The Guild of All Souls is an Anglican devotional society dedicated to prayer for faithful departed Christians.  As stated on its website, it is a "devotional society praying for the souls of the Faithful Departed, and teaching the Catholic doctrine of the Communion of Saints."

Objectives
The stated objectives of the guild are as follows:
 The celebration of Requiem Masses.
 Promotion of the Communion of Saints and the Resurrection of the Dead.
 Promotion of The Sacrament of Healing.
 Reservation of the Blessed Sacrament for the sick and the dying.

History
The Guild of All Souls was founded in March 1873 at St. James's Church, Hatcham. It was originally called the Guild Burial Society, with Father Arthur Tooth as the first president. The purpose of the Guild Burial Society was:

The work of the guild soon attracted the attention of other churches in England, and from a small parochial group it increased rapidly in membership throughout England.

 
In Chicago, 1885, an English delegation had a meeting with priests and lay persons of the Episcopal Church to build an American Branch. This was accomplished in 1889. In 1904 the Australian branch was founded in Melbourne. The National Shrine of the Sacred Heart at the Church of the Resurrection in New York City is the headquarters of the American branch of the guild.

Anglican devotional societies
Since the time of the Oxford Movement (also known as the "Catholic Revival") in the Church of England (and its sister churches), there have been organisations with the purpose of propagating Catholic faith and practice within the Anglican tradition. The Guild of All Souls is among the most prominent of these societies, which include the Society of King Charles the Martyr, the Society of Mary and the Confraternity of the Blessed Sacrament.

Each of these societies promotes one aspect of Catholic faith and practice that is not emphasised by the Anglican churches as a whole. For the Guild of All Souls this is the promotion of the Catholic understanding of death and resurrection and prayer for Christians who have died.

Chantry chapel
The Guild maintains the Chantry Chapel of Saint Michael and the Holy Souls at the Anglican Shrine of Our Lady of Walsingham in Walsingham.

See also 

Catholic Societies of the Church of England
Anglican Communion
Anglo-Catholicism
Confraternity of the Blessed Sacrament
Guild of Servants of the Sanctuary
Society of the Holy Cross
Society of King Charles the Martyr
Society of Mary (Anglican)

References

External links
 The Guild of All Souls (UK)
 The Guild of All Souls (US)
 The Guild of All Souls (Australian)
 Historical and bibliographic material on the Guild of All Souls from Project Canterbury

Anglican organizations
Anglo-Catholicism
Guilds in the United Kingdom